Chaplygin gas, which occurs in certain theories of cosmology, is a hypothetical substance that satisfies an exotic equation of state in the form
,
The substance is named after Sergey Chaplygin.

In some models, generalized Chaplygin gas is considered, where  is a parameter, which can take on values .

See also

 Dark fluid

References

Physical cosmology